Jerry Dexter (April 18, 1935 – June 21, 2013) was an American actor and radio presenter best known for playing teenage boys and young men in animated television series for Hanna-Barbera Productions from the late 1960s to the 1980s.

Early life, family and education
Dexter was born Jerry Morris Chrisman in San Francisco, California.

Career
He began his radio career at KENO in Las Vegas, Nevada, in 1958. After a stop at KVI in Seattle, Washington, Dexter relocated to Los Angeles, California, and KMPC in late 1959. He took his show, The Dexter Affair, in October 1962 to KLAC radio in Los Angeles.

In 1964, Dexter had a semi-regular role, playing Corporal Johnson in Gomer Pyle, U.S.M.C. He moved into a full-time television job in June 1968 with the launch of Good Day L.A. on KABC-TV.

Dexter's first cartoon voice work was in 1967 as Chuck in Shazzan. Among his roles were Gary Gulliver in The Adventures of Gulliver, Alan in Josie and the Pussycats, Ted in Goober and the Ghost Chasers, Hal in Sealab 2020, Biff in Fangface, Drak Jr. in Drak Pack, Superboy in an episode of Super Friends, and Sunfire in Spider-Man and His Amazing Friends. He also voiced characters for Filmation Studios during the late 1960s, most notably as the voice of Aqualad in the series Aquaman. He later guest-starred on Challenge of the GoBots, the 1980s revival of The Jetsons, as well as Wildfire, Snorks, DuckTales and Fantastic Max.

Personal life
Dexter resided in San Francisco, Las Vegas, Seattle and Los Angeles.

In June 2013, he suffered a fall in his home which resulted in head injuries. Jerry Dexter died on June 21, 2013.

Filmography

Live Action Film
Downhill Racer (1969) ... Engel

Animation
Shazzan (1967–1969) TV series ... Chuck
The Superman/Aquaman Hour of Adventure (1967–1968) TV series ... Aqualad
Space Ghost and Dino Boy (1967) TV series ... Chuck (episode: "The Final Encounter")
The Adventures of Gulliver (1968–1969) TV series ... Gary Gulliver
Josie and the Pussycats (1970–1972) TV series ... Alan M. Mayberry
The Funky Phantom (1971–1972) TV series ... Elmo the Dog
Sealab 2020 (1972) TV series ... Hal
Josie and the Pussycats in Outer Space (1972–1974) TV series ... Alan M. Mayberry
Goober and the Ghost Chasers (1973–1975) TV series ... Ted
The New Scooby-Doo Movies (1973) TV series ... Alan M. Mayberry (episode: "Scooby-Doo Meets Josie and the Pussycats: The Haunted Showboat")
Fred Flintstone and Friends (1977–1978) TV series ... Ted
Fangface (1978–1979) TV series ... Biff
Scooby-Doo and Scrappy-Doo (1979) TV series ... Additional voices 
The Plastic Man Comedy/Adventure Show (1979–1980) TV series ... Biff ("Fangface and Fangpuss" segment)
Drak Pack (1980–1982) TV series ... Drak Jr.
Spider-Man and His Amazing Friends (1981) TV series ... Sunfire (episode: "Sunfire")
The New Scooby and Scrappy-Doo Show (1983) TV series ... Additional voices
Super Friends (1983) TV series ... Superboy, Eric
The Voyages of Doctor Dolittle (1984) TV series ... Additional voices
Challenge of the GoBots (1984–1985) TV series ... Additional voices
The Jetsons (1985–1987) TV series ... Additional voices
Paw Paws (1985–1986) TV series ... Additional voices
Wildfire (1986) TV series ... Additional voices
The Greatest Adventure: Stories from the Bible (1986) Direct-to-video series ... Additional voices (episode: "Samson and Delilah")
Snorks (1987) TV series ... Additional voices
DuckTales (1987) TV series ... WASA Controller (episode: "The Right Duck")
Fantastic Max (1988–1989) TV series ... Additional voices

Live-action
Checkmate (1961) TV series ... The Ticketman (episode: "To the Best of My Recollection")
87th Precinct (1962) TV series ... Pat (episode: "Man in a Jam")
McHale's Navy (1963) TV series ... The Ensign (episode: "The Captain Steals a Crook")
Alcoa Premiere (1963) TV series ... Physical Therapist (episode: "The Broken Year")
Hazel (1964) TV series ... Cab Driver (episode: "Welcome Back, Kevin")
Gomer Pyle, U.S.M.C. (1964) TV series ... Corporal Johnson
The Reluctant Astronaut (1966) ... Technician (uncredited)
Dragnet 1967 (1967) TV series ... Himself (episode: "The Subscription Racket")
Downhill Racer (1969) ... Ron Engel
Apple's Way (1974) TV series ... Harold (episode: "The Applicant")
ABC Afterschool Specials (1975) TV series ... Pete Degley (episode: "The Skating Rink")
Ann Jillian (1989–1990) TV series ... (episodes: "Buddy System", "Good Citizen Ann")

References

External links
 

1935 births
2013 deaths
Accidental deaths from falls
Accidental deaths in California
American radio personalities
American male television actors
American male voice actors
Hanna-Barbera people
Male actors from California